Francisco Señor Martín (born August 13, 1906 in Spain, died August 16, 1973 in France) was a Spanish trade unionist.

Biography 
A member of the National Confederation of Labor (CNT), in his youth was an active member of the metal union of the CNT in Barcelona. In 1932 he was a member of the National Committee of the CNT, whose general secretary was Manuel Rivas Barros, and the following year he was a delegate for the manufacturing sector in the Catalan regional plenum.

After the outbreak of the Spanish Civil War he joined the confederal militias. He later became a political commissar of the People's Army of the Republic, serving in the 153rd Mixed Brigade as well as the 24th and 32nd divisions, operating on the fronts of Aragon and Catalonia.

At the end of the war he went into exile in France. During the years of the  Nazi occupation, he was one of the delegates in Toulouse of the clandestine leadership of the CNT - established in Marseille in December 1943. In March 1944, during the plenary session of Muret, he was elected a member of the National Committee of the CNT. In this capacity, he was one of the signatories to the constitution of the Junta Española de Liberación (JEL) in Toulouse, on October 23, 1944.

He died in Paris on August 16, 1973.

He left a widow, Aurora Barceló (born July 29, 1908, died July 22, 1993), and 4 children:

- François (born March 15, 1930),

- Aurore (born on May 15, 1934),

- Michel (born November 26, 1939) and

- Armonie (born February 15, 1946).

References

Bibliography 
  
 
 

1906 births
1973 deaths
Anarchist partisans
Spanish anarchists
Spanish military personnel of the Spanish Civil War (Republican faction)